Vasalja is a village in Vas county, Hungary.

Sightseeings
The old church has origin from the Árpád age. It has romanesque style, the southern doorway is decorated by a triangular outstanding roof. In the tympanon the lamb and the cross can be seen carved in traditional form.

Populated places in Vas County
Romanesque architecture in Hungary